George Josten (born May 12, 1986) is a retired American soccer player who last played for Portland Timbers in the USSF Division-2 Professional League.

Career

College and amateur
Josten attended Idaho Falls High School and played college soccer at Gonzaga University, where he scored 34 goals in 79 career games over four years. He finished his collegiate career ranked third all-time in school history in goals and assists and fourth in points, was named to the All-West Coast Conference first team for three consecutive seasons between 2005 and 2007, and was also named in the NSCAA All-Far West Region first team in 2006 and 2007.

During his college years Josten also played with Michigan Bucks in the USL Premier Development League, helping them to the PDL Championship Game in 2007.

Professional
Josten was selected in the second Round (20th overall) of the 2008 MLS SuperDraft by the Columbus Crew. He made his full professional debut for Columbus on May 27, 2008, coming on as a substitute for Alejandro Moreno in a US Open Cup game against Real Salt Lake.

After spending time on loan with the Cleveland City Stars in the USL Second Division, and despite recording one goal and two assists in eleven MLS Reserve Division matches, Josten was released by Columbus at the end of the 2008 season, having never played a single minute of MLS league soccer.

He signed for Portland Timbers of the USL First Division on February 20, 2009.

Honors

Portland Timbers
USL First Division Commissioner's Cup (1): 2009

References

External links
Portland Timbers bio
MLS player profile
Gonzaga bio

1986 births
Living people
American soccer players
Columbus Crew players
Gonzaga Bulldogs men's soccer players
Cleveland City Stars players
Flint City Bucks players
Portland Timbers (2001–2010) players
USL League Two players
USL First Division players
USL Second Division players
USSF Division 2 Professional League players
Columbus Crew draft picks
Soccer players from Idaho
Association football forwards
Association football midfielders